Antzuola is a town located in the province of Gipuzkoa, in the autonomous community of Basque Country, in the North of Spain.

References

External links

Official website 
ANTZUOLA in the Bernardo Estornés Lasa - Auñamendi Encyclopedia (Euskomedia Fundazioa) 

Municipalities in Gipuzkoa